Turakapally is a village in the suburb of Shamirpet Mandal of Medchal-Malkajgiri district in Telangana, India. The area is the headquarters for 
Genome Valley - Bharat Biotech Park, IKP Knowledge Park, and Alexandria Knowledge Park.

References

Villages in Ranga Reddy district